Elias Francis Merfalen (born 7 September 1989 in Tamuning, Guam) is a Guamanian footballer who plays as a striker for Cars Plus.

He works besides as Team manager of the Guam national under-19 football team.

References

1989 births
Living people
People from Tamuning, Guam
Guamanian footballers
Guam international footballers
Guam Shipyard players
Association football forwards
Chamorro people